Players in bold are currently playing in the Chinese Super League.

 As of 15 Feb 2023.

Naturalized players

Chinese-descent 
  Nico Yennaris, Chinese name Li Ke (2019–2022 Beijing Sinobo Guoan)
  John Hou Sæter, Chinese name Hou Yongyong (2019–2021, 2022 Beijing Sinobo Guoan)
  Alexander N'Doumbou, Chinese name Qian Jiegei (2019–2022 Shanghai Greenland Shenhua, 2023– Zhejiang)
  Tyias Browning, Chinese name Jiang Guangtai (2020–2022 Guangzhou Evergrande Taobao, 2022– Shanghai Port)
  Denny Wang, Chinese name Wang Yi (2021– Shanghai Shenhua)
  Chico Chen, Chinese name Chen Jiayu (2021 Hebei F.C.)
  Dai Wai Tsun, Chinese name Dai Weijun (2022– Shenzhen F.C.)
  Ming-yang Yang, Chinese name Yang Mingyang (2023– Nantong Zhiyun)

Non-Chinese-descent 
  Pedro Delgado, Chinese name Deerjiaduo (2019, 2021 Shandong Taishan)
  Elkeson, Chinese name Ai Kesen (2020–2021 Guangzhou Evergrande Taobao)
  Fernando Henrique, Chinese name Fei Nanduo (2020–2021 Guangzhou Evergrande Taobao)
  Aloísio, Chinese name Luo Guofu (2020–2021 Guangzhou Evergrande Taobao)
  Ricardo Goulart, Chinese name Gao Late (2020 Hebei China Fortune, 2021 Guangzhou F.C.)
  Alan Carvalho, Chinese name A Lan (2020 Beijing Sinobo Guoan, 2021 Guangzhou F.C.)

Africa – CAF

Algeria 
 Karim Benounes (2008 Zhejiang Greentown)

Angola 
 Quinzinho (2006–2007 Xiamen Lanshi)
 Johnson Macaba (2008 Shenzhen Shangqingyin)
 Nando Rafael (2014 Henan Jianye)

Burkina Faso  
 Abdoul-Aziz Nikiema (2009 Qingdao Jonoon)

Cameroon 
 Clément Lebe (2004–2007 Liaoning Zhongyu)
 Albert Baning (2005 Shanghai Zobon)
 Didier Njewel (2005 Shanghai Zobon) 
 Daniel Wansi (2006 Shenzhen Kingway)
 Aboubakar Oumarou (2007–2008 Changsha Ginde)
 Jean-Paul Ndeki (2008 Qingdao Jonoon)
 William Paul Modibo (2009 Beijing Guoan)
 Jean Michel N'Lend (2010 Shanghai Shenhua, 2011 Liaoning Whowin)
 Modeste M'bami (2011 Changchun Yatai)
 Stéphane Mbia (2016–2017 Hebei China Fortune, 2019, 2021 Wuhan Zall, 2020 Shanghai Greenland Shenhua)
 Christian Bassogog (2017–2020 Henan Jianye, 2021– Shanghai Shenhua)
 Olivier Boumal (2017 Liaoning Whowin)
 Benjamin Moukandjo (2017 Jiangsu Suning, 2018 Beijing Renhe)
 Christian Bekamenga (2017 Liaoning Whowin)
 Franck Ohandza (2019 Henan Jianye)
 John Mary (2019–2020 Shenzhen F.C.)
 Joseph Minala (2020 Qingdao Huanghai)
 Donovan Ewolo (2022– Zhejiang)

Cape Verde 
 Ricardo (2011 Shandong Luneng)
 Dady (2013 Shanghai Shenhua)

Central African Republic 
 Lobi Manzoki (2022– Dalian Pro)

Congo 
 Thievy Bifouma (2020 Shenzhen F.C.)

Congo DR 
 Delain Sasa (2008 Liaoning Whowin)
 Alain Masudi (2009 Dalian Shide)
 M'peti Nimba (2010 Changsha Ginde)
 Jeremy Bokila (2015 Guangzhou R&F)
 Gaël Kakuta (2016 Hebei China Fortune)
 Assani Lukimya (2016–2017 Liaoning Whowin)
 Cédric Bakambu (2018–2021 Beijing Sinobo Guoan)
 Oscar Maritu (2020, 2021– Cangzhou Mighty Lions)

Côte d'Ivoire 
 Guillaume Dah Zadi (2007–2008 Changchun Yatai)
 Bamba Moussa (2007 Shenzhen Shangqingyin)
 Dramane Kamaté (2007 Shenzhen Shangqingyin)
 Mariko Daouda (2008 Tianjin Teda, 2010 Chongqing Lifan)
 Didier Drogba (2012 Shanghai Shenhua)
 Davy Claude Angan (2013–2016 Hangzhou Greentown)
 Jean Evrard Kouassi (2015–2016 Shanghai SIPG, 2019–2021 Wuhan Zall, 2023– Zhejiang)
 Franck Boli (2015 Liaoning Whowin)
 Gervinho (2016–2018 Hebei China Fortune)
 Kévin Boli (2018 Guizhou HFZC)

Egypt 
 Mohamed Abougrisha (2008 Zhejiang Greentown) 
 Ahmed Salah Hosny (2008 Zhejiang Greentown)
 Ali Ghazal (2017 Guizhou HFZC)

Gabon 
 Malick Evouna (2016 Tainjin Teda)

Gambia 
 Arthur Gómez (2007 Henan Construction)
 Bubacarr Trawally (2016–2017 Yanbian Funde, 2018 Guizhou Hengfeng)

Ghana 
 Kwame Ayew (2004–2006 Inter Shanghai)
 Moses Sakyi (2009 Hangzhou Greentown)
 Lee Addy (2012 Dalian Aerbin)
 Chris Dickson (2013 Shanghai East Asia)
 Ransford Addo (2013–2014 Shanghai East Asia)
 Asamoah Gyan (2015–2016 Shanghai SIPG)
 Frank Acheampong (2017–2020 Tianjin Teda, 2021– Shenzhen F.C.)
 Richmond Boakye (2018 Jiangsu Suning)
 Emmanuel Boateng (2019–2021 Dalian Yifang)
 Mubarak Wakaso (2020 Jiangsu Suning, 2021–2022 Shenzhen F.C.)
 Emmanuel Agyemang-Badu (2021 Qingdao F.C.)
 Abdul-Aziz Yakubu (2023– Wuhan Three Towns)

Guinea 
 Ousmane Bangoura (2006 Shenyang Ginde)
 Lonsana Doumbouya (2021 Shanghai Shenhua)
 José Kanté (2022 Cangzhou Mighty Lions)

Guinea-Bissau 
 Eddi Gomes (2015–2017 Henan Jianye)
 Romário Baldé (2023– Nantong Zhiyun)

Kenya 
 Michael Olunga (2017 Guizhou HFZC)
 Ayub Masika (2018–2019 Beijing Renhe)

Mali 
 Boubacar Diarra (2010 Liaoning Whowin)
 Mourtala Diakité (2010 Shandong Luneng)
 Frédéric Kanouté (2012–2013 Beijing Guoan)
 Seydou Keita (2012–2013 Dalian Aerbin)
 Garra Dembélé (2013 Wuhan Zall)
 Mohamed Sissoko (2015 Shanghai Greenland Shenhua)

Mauritania 
 Oumar Camara (2023– Nantong Zhiyun)

Morocco 
 Nabil Baha (2013 Dalian Aerbin)
 Abderrazak Hamdallah (2014–2015 Guangzhou R&F)
 Issam El Adoua (2015 Chongqing Lifan)
 Ayoub El Kaabi (2018–2019 Hebei China Fortune)

Mozambique 
 Simão Mate Junior (2012 Shandong Luneng)
 Zainadine Júnior (2016 Tainjin Teda)

Niger 
 Moussa Maâzou (2015 Changchun Yatai)

Nigeria 
 Kola Adams (2004–2005 Inter Shanghai)
 Samuel Ayorinde (2004 Shenyang Ginde)
 Prince Ikpe Ekong (2004 Shenyang Ginde)
 Benedict Akwuegbu (2006 Tianjin Teda, 2007 Qingdao Jonoon)
 Henry Makinwa (2006 Tianjin Teda)
 Gabriel Melkam (2006–2007 Xiamen Lanshi, 2008–2009 Changchun Yatai, 2011–2013 Qingdao Jonoon)
 Deniran Ortega (2006 Chongqing Lifan)
 Garba Lawal (2007 Changsha Ginde)
 Obi Moneke (2008–2010 Henan Construction)
 Edison Joseph (2009 Shaanxi Chanba)
 Pascal Kondaponi (2009 Qingdao Jonoon)
 Ernest Jeremiah Chukwuma (2009 Hangzhou Greentown)
 Alfred Emuejeraye (2010 Tianjin Teda)
 Akanni-Sunday Wasiu (2010 Changsha Ginde)
 Victor Agali (2010 Jiangsu Sainty)
 Obiora Odita (2011 Tianjin Teda) 
 Peter Utaka (2012–2013 Dalian Aerbin, 2013–2014 Beijing Guoan, 2014 Shanghai Shenxin)
 Yakubu (2012–2013 Guangzhou R&F)
 Bentley (2013 Wuhan Zall)
 Aaron Samuel Olanare (2014–2015 Guangzhou R&F)
 Derick Ogbu (2014–2015 Liaoning Whowin)
 Daniel Chima (2015 Shanghai Shenxin)
 Obafemi Martins (2016–2018, 2020 Shanghai Greenland Shenhua, 2020 Wuhan Zall)
 Anthony Ujah (2016–2017 Liaoning Whowin)
 Mikel John Obi (2017–2018 Tianjin Teda)
 Odion Ighalo (2017–2018 Changchun Yatai, 2019 Shanghai Greenland Shenhua)
 Brown Ideye (2017 Tianjin Teda)
 Sone Aluko (2019 Beijing Renhe)
 Samuel Adegbenro (2022– Beijing Guoan)
 Chisom Egbuchulam (2022– Meizhou Hakka)

Senegal 
 Mouchid Iyane Ly (2009 Shenzhen Ruby)
 Amado Diallo (2010 Henan Construction)
 Adama François Sene (2011–2012 Beijing Guoan)
 Ladji Keita (2011 Beijing Guoan)
 Jacques Faty (2013 Wuhan Zall)
 Demba Ba (2015–2016, 2018 Shanghai Greenland Shenhua)
 Ibrahima Touré (2016 Liaoning Whowin)
 Mbaye Diagne (2016–2017 Tianjin Teda)
 Papiss Cissé (2016–2018 Shandong Luneng)
 Makhete Diop (2018–2019 Beijing Renhe)
 Cheikh M'Bengue (2019 Shenzhen F.C.)
 André Senghor (2021 Cangzhou Mighty Lions)
 Cherif Ndiaye (2022 Shanghai Port)

Sierra Leone 
 Mohamed Kallon (2010 Shaanxi Chanba)
 Aluspah Brewah (2010 Jiangsu Sainty)
 Gibril Sankoh (2014 Henan Jianye)
 Mohamed Buya Turay (2020 Hebei China Fortune, 2021–2022 Henan Songshan Longmen)
 Issa Kallon (2022– Shanghai Port)

South Africa 
 Bennett Mnguni (2005 Tianjin Teda)
 Dino Ndlovu (2022 Changchun Yatai)

Togo 
 Djima Oyawolé (2004–2005 Shenzhen Jianlibao)
 Massamasso Tchangai (2009 Shenzhen Ruby)

Tunisia 
 Imed Ben Younes (2007 Henan Construction)
 Enis Hajri (2012 Henan Construction)
 Bassem Boulaabi (2015 Hangzhou Greentown)
 Imed Louati (2015 Hangzhou Greentown)

Uganda 
 Andrew Mwesigwa (2010 Chongqing Lifan)

Zambia 
 James Chamanga (2008–2012 Dalian Shide, 2013–2017 Liaoning Whowin)
 Billy Mwanza (2009 Changsha Ginde)
 Christopher Katongo (2011–2012 Henan Construction)
 Isaac Chansa (2012 Henan Construction)
 Stoppila Sunzu (2015 Shanghai Greenlad Shenhua, 2020– Shijiazhuang Ever Bright)
 Jacob Mulenga (2015–2016 Shijiazhuang Ever Bright)
 Evans Kangwa (2023– Qingdao Hainiu)

Zimbabwe 
 Nyasha Mushekwi (2018–2019 Dalian Yifang, 2022– Zhejiang)

Asia – AFC

Australia 
 Ryan Griffiths (2007–2008 Liaoning FC, 2009–2010 Beijing Guoan) 
 Joel Griffiths (2009–2011 Beijing Guoan, 2012 Shanghai Shenhua, 2013 Qingdao Jonoon)
 Matt McKay (2009 Changchun Yatai, 2013 Changchun Yatai)
 Mark Milligan (2009 Shanghai Shenhua)
 Mark Bridge (2009 Tianjin Teda)
 Jonas Salley (2009–2010 Shaanxi Chanba, 2011 Chengdu Blades, 2012 Shanghai Shenxin, 2013–2014 Guizhou Renhe)
 Brendon Šantalab (2009, 2011 Chengdu Blades)
 Chris Coyne (2010 Liaoning Whowin)
 Adam Griffiths (2010–2011 Hangzhou Greentown)
 Adam Kwasnik (2011 Chengdu Blades)
 Alex Wilkinson (2011 Jiangsu Sainty)
 Bruce Djite (2011 Jiangsu Sainty)
 Dean Heffernan (2011 Liaoning Whowin)
 Dino Djulbic (2011–2012 Guizhou Renhe)
 Mile Sterjovski (2012 Dalian Aerbin)
 Rostyn Griffiths (2012–2013 Guangzhou R&F)
 Milan Susak (2012 Tianjin Teda)
 Daniel Mullen (2012–2013 Dalian Aerbin)
 Ryan McGowan (2013–2014 Shandong Luneng, 2016 Henan Jianye, 2017 Guizhou HFZC)
 Michael Marrone (2013 Shanghai Shenxin)
 Erik Paartalu (2013 Tianjin Teda)
 Bernie Ibini-Isei (2013 Shanghai SIPG)
 Daniel McBreen (2013–2014 Shanghai SIPG)
 Eddy Bosnar (2013 Guangzhou R&F)
 Adam Hughes (2014 Harbin Yiteng)
 Billy Celeski (2014 Liaoning Whowin)
 Josh Mitchell (2014–2015 Liaoning Whowin)
 Tim Cahill (2015 Shanghai Greenland Shenhua, 2016 Hangzhou Greentown)
 Adrian Leijer (2015 Chongqing Lifan)
 Matthew Spiranovic (2015–2016 Hangzhou Greentown)
 Michael Thwaite (2016 Liaoning Whowin)
 Trent Sainsbury (2016, 2017 Jiangsu Suning)
 James Troisi (2016 Liaoning Whowin)
 Aleksandar Jovanović (2016 Tianjin Teda)
 Apostolos Giannou (2016–2017 Guangzhou R&F)
 Dario Vidošić (2016 Liaoning Whowin)
 James Holland (2017 Liaoning Whowin)
 Robbie Kruse (2017 Liaoning Whowin)
 Aaron Mooy (2020–2022 Shanghai SIPG)

Chinese Taipei 
 Xavier Chen (2013–2015 Guizhou Renhe)
 Chen Po-liang (2014 Shanghai Shenhua, 2015–2016 Hangzhou Lucheng, 2021 Changchun Yatai)
 Ko Yu-ting (2015–2017 Changchun Yatai)
 Yaki Yen (2016–2017 Changchun Yatai, 2020 Qingdao Huanghai, 2022– Wuhan Three Towns)
 Tim Chow (2019–2021 Henan Jianye, 2022– Chengdu Rongcheng)
 Will Donkin (2022– Shenzhen F.C.)
 Wang Chien-ming (2023– Qingdao Hainiu)

Hong Kong 
 Ng Wai Chiu (2005 Shanghai Zobon, 2006–2008 Shanghai Shenhua, 2009–2010 Hangzhou Greentown)
 Godfred Karikari (2012–2013 Henan Jianye)
 Lee Chi Ho (2013 Beijing Guoan)
 Wisdom Fofo Agbo (2014 Harbin Yiteng)
 Brian Fok (2014 Shanghai Shenhua)
 Bai He (2015 Shijiazhuang Ever Bright)
 Jack Sealy (2016–2017 Changchun Yatai)
 Festus Baise (2017–2018 Guizhou Zhicheng)
 Au Yeung Yiu Chung (2017 Guizhou Zhicheng)
 Jean-Jacques Kilama (2017 Tianjin Quanjian)
 Andy Russell (2019 Hebei China Fortune)
 Alex Tayo Akande (2019 Dalian Yifang)
 Tan Chun Lok (2019– Guangzhou R&F)
 Dai Wai Tsun (2020– Shenzhen F.C.)
 Vas Nuñez (2022 Meizhou Hakka, 2022– Dalian Pro)
 Leung Nok Hang (2022– Zhejiang)
 Yue Tze Nam (2022– Meizhou Hakka)
 Li Ngai Hoi (2023– Nantong Zhiyun)

Iran 
 Morteza Pouraliganji (2015 Tianjin Teda, 2020–2021 Shenzhen F.C.)

Iraq 
Hussein Alaa Hussein (2009 Qingdao Jonoon, 2010 Shenzhen Ruby)
Nashat Akram (2014 Dalian Aerbin)

Japan 
 Takashi Rakuyama (2011 Shenzhen Ruby)
 Seiichiro Maki (2011 Shenzhen Ruby)
 Masashi Oguro (2013 Hangzhou Greentown)
 Sergio Escudero (2015 Jiangsu Guoxin Sainty)

Korea DPR 
 Kim Yong-Jun (2008 Chengdu Blades)
 Ryang Myong-Il (2009 Chengdu Blades)

Korea Republic 
 Lee Kyung-Soo (2004 Sichuan Guancheng)
 Song Tae-Lim (2009–2010 Henan Construction)
 Jeon Woo-Keun (2009 Dalian Shide)
 Ahn Jung-Hwan (2009–2011 Dalian Shide)
 Lee Tae-Young (2009 Qingdao Jonoon)
 Sim Jae-Won (2009 Changsha Ginde)
 Kim Eun-Jung (2009 Changsha Ginde)
 Lee Sang-Il (2009 Changsha Ginde)
 Lee Se-In (2010 Changchun Yatai)
 Park Jae-hong (2010 Jiangsu Sainty)
 Lee Jon-Ming (2010 Qingdao Jonoon)
 Woo Choo-Young (2010 Changsha Ginde)
 Cho Se-Kwon (2010 Chongqing Lifan)
 Lee Yoon-Sup (2010 Qingdao Jonoon)
 Jeon Kwang-Jin (2011 Dalian Shide)
 Kim Jin-kyu (2011 Dalian Shide)
 Cho Won-Hee (2011–2012 Guangzhou Evergrande, 2013 Wuhan Zall)
 Lee Joon-Yeop (2011 Henan Construction)
 Kim Yoo-Jin (2011–2012, 2015 Liaoning Whowin)
 Ko Jae-Sung (2011 Nanchang Hengyuan)
 Kwon Jip (2011 Tianjin Teda)
 Song Chong-Gug (2011 Tianjin Teda)
 Park Dong-Hyuk (2012 Dalian Shide)
 Jeong Dong-Ho (2012 Hangzhou Greentown)
 Kim Dong-Jin (2012–2013 Hangzhou Greentown)
 Son Seung-Joon (2012 Henan Construction)
 Kim Young-Gwon (2012–2018 Guangzhou Evergrande)
 Ha Dae-Sung (2014–2015 Beijing Guoan)
 Jang Hyun-Soo (2014–2017 Guangzhou R&F)
 Park Jong-Woo (2014–2015 Guangzhou R&F)
 Son Dae-Ho (2014 Hangzhou Greentown)
 Lee Ji-Nam (2014 Henan Jianye)
 Yoon Sin-Young (2014 Jiangsu Sainty)
 Cho Byung-Kuk (2014 Shanghai Greenland)
 Lim You-Hwan (2014–2015 Shanghai Shenxin)
 Noh Hyung-Goo (2014 Harbin Yiteng)
 Choi Hyun-Yeon (2014 Harbin Yiteng)
 Park Ju-Sung (2015 Guizhou Renhe)
 Kim Ju-Young (2015–2016 Shanghai SIPG, 2017 Hebei China Fortune)
 Cho Yong-Hyung (2015–2016 Shijiazhuang Ever Bright)
 Jung In-Whan (2015 Henan Jianye)
 Ha Tae-Goon (2016 Yanbian Funde)
 Yoon Bit-Garam (2016–2017 Yanbian Funde)
 Kim Seung-Dae (2016–2017 Yanbian Funde)
 Oh Beom-Seok (2016 Hangzhou Greentown)
 Jung Woo-Young (2016–2017 Chongqing Lifan)
 Kim Kee-Hee (2016–2017 Shanghai Greenland Shenhua)
 Hong Jeong-Ho (2016–2017 Jiangsu Suning)
 Kim Hyung-il (2017 Guangzhou Evergrande Taobao)
 Kwon Kyung-Won (2017–2019 Tianjin Quanjian)
 Hwang Seok-Ho (2017 Tianjin Teda)
 Hwang Il-Su (2017 Yanbian Funde)
 Kim Min-jae (2019–2021 Beijing Sinobo Guoan)
 Park Ji-soo (2019–2020 Guangzhou Evergrande Taobao)
 Kim Shin-wook (2019–2021 Shanghai Greenland Shenhua)
 Song Ju-hun (2019 Tianjin Tianhai, 2020 Shenzhen F.C.)
 Kim Sung-hwan (2020 Henan Jianye)
 Sun Jun-ho (2021– Shandong Taishan)
 Kang Sang-woo (2022– Beijing Guoan)
 Kim Min-woo (2022– Chengdu Rongcheng)
 Lim Chai-min (2022 Shenzhen F.C.)

Lebanon 
 Roda Antar (2009–2013 Shandong Luneng, 2014 Jiangsu Sainty, 2015 Hangzhou Greentown)
 Mohammed Ali Khan (2014 Tianjin Teda)

Philippines 
 Javier Patiño (2015–2017 Henan Jianye)

Syria 
 Adel Abdullah (2010 Nanchang Hengyuan)
 Ali Diab (2010 Shanghai Shenhua)
 Abdulkader Dakka (2011 Shanghai Shenhua)
 George Mourad (2013 Qingdao Jonoon)
 Firas Al-Khatib (2013–2014 Shanghai Shenhua)
 Ahmad Al Salih (2017 Henan Jianye)

Uzbekistan 
 Aleksandr Kletskov (2009 Jiangsu Sainty, 2010 Tianjin Teda) 
 Aleksey Nikolaev (2009 Shenzhen Ruby)
 Sadriddin Abdullaev (2009 Changchun Yatai)
 Zaynitdin Tadjiyev (2009 Tianjin Teda)
 Farhod Tojiyev (2010 Tianjin Teda)
 Asqar Jadigerov (2010 Nanchang Hengyuan)
 Islom Inomov (2010 Liaoning Whowin)
 Anzur Ismailov (2011–2018 Changchun Yatai)
 Ildar Magdeev (2011 Qingdao Jonoon)
 Murod Kholmukhamedov (2011 Dalian Shide)
 Kamoliddin Tajiev (2011–2013 Jiangsu Sainty)
 Aziz Ibrahimov (2011–2012 Qingdao Jonoon)
 Egor Krimets (2013, 2016–2017 Beijing Guoan)
 Shavkat Mullajanov (2013 Liaoning Whowin)
 Sherzod Karimov (2013 Qingdao Jonoon)
 Artyom Filiposyan (2014 Liaoning Whowin)
 Igor Sergeev (2016 Beijing Guoan)
 Odil Ahmedov (2017–2020 Shanghai SIPG, 2020 Tianjin TEDA, 2021 Cangzhou Mighty Lions)
 Dostonbek Tursunov (2021 Chongqing Liangjiang Athletic)

Europe – UEFA

Albania 
 Nevil Dede (2008 Changsha Ginde)
 Hamdi Salihi (2013 Jiangsu Sainty)
 Valdet Rama (2017 Yanbian Funde)

Austria 
 Marko Arnautović (2019–2021 Shanghai SIPG)
 Richard Windbichler (2022– Chengdu Rongcheng)
 Peter Žulj (2022– Changchun Yatai)

Azerbaijan 
 Branimir Subašić (2009 Changchun Yatai)

Bosnia and Herzegovina 
 Alen Avdić (2004 Liaoning Zhongyu)
 Sead Bučan (2004–2005 Shenyang Ginde)
 Ninoslav Milenković (2010 Qingdao Jonoon)
 Vladimir Jovančić (2012–2013 Tianjin Teda)
 Zlatan Muslimović (2012–2014 Guizhou Renhe)
 Mario Božić (2012 Shanghai Shenhua)
 Zvjezdan Misimović (2013–2014, 2015 Guizhou Renhe)
 Sejad Salihović (2015 Guizhou Renhe)
 Samir Memišević (2020–2021 Hebei China Fortune, 2022 Beijing Guoan)
 Toni Šunjić (2020– Henan Jianye)
 Elvis Sarić (2023– Qingdao Hainiu)

Belarus 
 Alyaksandr Khatskevich (2004 Tianjin Teda)
 Raman Kirenkin (2008 Liaoning Whowin)
 Vyacheslav Hleb (2009 Shanghai Shenhua, 2010 Shenzhen Ruby)
 Sergey Krivets (2012–2013 Jiangsu Sainty)

Belgium 
Kevin Oris (2014 Liaoning Whowin)
 Axel Witsel (2017–2018 Tianjin Quanjian)
 Yannick Carrasco (2018–2019 Dalian Yifang)
 Mousa Dembélé (2019–2021 Guangzhou R&F)
 Marouane Fellaini (2019– Shandong Luneng Taishan)

Bulgaria 
 Zoran Janković (2004–2007 Dalian Shide)
 Predrag Pažin (2005–2007 Shandong Luneng)
 Ivo Trenchev (2007–2008 Henan Construction)F
 Svetoslav Petrov (2007 Changchun Yatai)
 Yordan Varbanov (2008–2009 Zhejiang Greentown)
 Kaloyan Karadzhinov (2008 Dalian Shide)
 Georgi Chilikov (2008 Dalian Shide)
 Yanko Valkanov (2009 Shanghai Shenhua, 2010 Shenzhen Ruby)
 Martin Kamburov (2010–2012 Dalian Shide)
 Marquinhos (2012 Changchun Yatai)
 Georgi Iliev (2015 Shijiazhuang Ever Bright)
 Borislav Tsonev (2022– Dalian Pro)

Croatia 
 Josip Bulat (2004 Qingdao Beilaite)
 Ivan Bulat (2004 Chongqing Qiche, 2005–2007 Inter Shanghai)
 Velibor Kopunović (2006 Chongqing Lifan, 2006 Qingdao Jonoon)
 Darko Čordaš (2006 Chongqing Lifan)
 Jurica Vučko (2007 Tianjin Teda)
 Darko Matić (2007–2008 Tianjin Teda, 2009–2015 Beijing Guoan, 2016 Changchun Yatai)
 Igor Budiša (2007 Qingdao Jonoon)
 Igor Tkalčević (2008 Chengdu Blades)
 Vedran Celiščak (2008 Dalian Shide)
 Stjepan Jukić (2010 Qingdao Jonoon)
 Frane Čačić (2010 Changsha Ginde)
 Bruno Šiklić (2010 Chongqing Lifan)
 Ivan Brečević (2010 Shaanxi Chanba)
 Krunoslav Lovrek (2012 Qingdao Jonoon)
 Leon Benko (2014 Dalian Aerbin)
 Sammir (2015–2016 Jiangsu Guoxin Sainty, 2016 Hangzhou Greentown)
 Goran Milović (2016–2017 Chongqing Lifan)
 Mislav Oršić (2016 Changchun Yatai)
 Nikica Jelavić (2017–2018 Guizhou HFZC)
 Ivan Santini (2019–2020 Jiangsu Suning)
 Dejan Radonjić (2020–2021 Qingdao Huanghai, 2022 Tianjin Jinmen Tiger)
 Matej Jonjić (2021 Shanghai Shenhua)
 Ante Majstorović (2021 Shanghai Port)
 Marko Dabro (2022 Beijing Guoan)
 Franko Andrijašević (2022– Zhejiang)

Czech Republic 
 Marek Jarolím (2013 Hangzhou Greentown)
Jan Rezek (2013 Changchun Yatai)
 Bořek Dočkal (2017 Henan Jianye)

Denmark 
 Ken Ilsø (2014 Guangzhou R&F)
 Lasse Vibe (2018 Changchun Yatai)
 Jores Okore (2021– Changchun Yatai)

England 
 Akpo Sodje (2012 Tianjin Teda)
 Tyias Browning (2019, 2020–2022 Guangzhou Evergrande Taobao, 2022– Shanghai Port)

Estonia 
 Andres Oper (2009 Shanghai Shenhua)

France 
 Nicolas Ouédec (2004 Shandong Luneng)
 Jean-Philippe Caillet (2009 Tianjin Teda)
 Cédric Sabin (2010 Shaanxi Chanba)
 Michaël Murcy (2010 Shandong Luneng)
 Nicolas Anelka (2012 Shanghai Shenhua)
 Mathieu Manset (2012 Shanghai Shenhua)
 Guillaume Hoarau (2013 Dalian Aerbin)
 Julien Gorius (2016 Changchun Yatai)
 Jean-Philippe Mendy (2016 Shijiazhuang Ever Bright)
 Anthony Modeste (2017–2018 Tianjin Quanjian)
 Romain Alessandrini (2020–2021 Qingdao Huanghai, 2022– Shenzhen F.C.)
 Eddy Gnahoré (2020 Wuhan Zall)
 Jules Iloki (2021 Tianjin Jinmen Tiger)

Germany 
 Jörg Albertz (2004 Shanghai Shenhua)
 Carsten Jancker (2006 Shanghai Shenhua)
 Mike Hanke (2014 Guizhou Renhe)
 Felix Bastians (2018–2020 Tianjin Teda)
 Sandro Wagner (2019 Tianjin Teda)
 Streli Mamba (2022– Dalian Pro)

Georgia 
 Elguja Lobjanidze (2023– Meizhou Hakka)

Greece 
 Avraam Papadopoulos (2015 Shanghai Greenland Shenhua)

Hungary 
 Zoltán Kovács (2004 Shenzhen Jianlibao)
 Krisztián Kenesei (2004–2006 Beijing Guoan)
 Szabolcs Huszti (2014–2015, 2017 Changchun Yatai)
 Ákos Elek (2015 Changchun Yatai)
 Richárd Guzmics (2017 Yanbian Funde)
 Tamás Kádár (2020 Shandong Luneng Taishan, 2021 Tianjin Jinmen Tiger)

Iceland 
 Viðar Kjartansson (2015 Jiangsu Guoxin Sainty)
 Sölvi Ottesen  (2015 Jiangsu Guoxin Sainty, 2017 Guangzhou R&F)
 Eiður Guðjohnsen  (2015 Shijiazhuang Ever Bright)

Israel 
 Liron Zarko (2009 Chongqing Lifan)
 Eran Zahavi (2016–2020 Guangzhou R&F)
 Dia Saba (2019–2020 Guangzhou R&F)

Italy 
 Damiano Tommasi (2009 Tianjin Teda)
 Fabio Firmani (2011 Shaanxi Chanba)
 Alessandro Diamanti (2014 Guangzhou Evergrande)
 Alberto Gilardino (2014 Guangzhou Evergrande)
 Graziano Pellè (2016–2020 Shandong Luneng)
 Gabriel Paletta (2018–2019 Jiangsu Suning)
 Éder (2018–2020 Jiangsu Suning)
 Stephan El Shaarawy (2019–2020 Shanghai Greenland Shenhua)

Kazakhstan 
 Georgy Zhukov (2022– Cangzhou Mighty Lions)

Malta 
 John Hutchinson (2011 Chengdu Blades)

Montenegro 
 Goran Trobok (2005 Shanghai Shenhua)
 Igor Gluščević (2006 Shandong Luneng)
 Čedomir Mijanović (2007 Changsha Ginde)
 Dejan Damjanović (2014 Jiangsu Sainty, 2014–2015 Beijing Guoan)
 Radomir Đalović (2014 Shanghai Shenxin)
 Fatos Bećiraj (2014 Changchun Yatai)
 Nebojša Kosović (2022– Meizhou Hakka)
 Asmir Kajević (2022 Wuhan Yangtze River)

Netherlands 
 Fred Benson (2010 Shandong Luneng)
 Sjoerd Ars (2012 Tianjin Teda)
 Tjaronn Chery (2017–2018 Guizhou HFZC)
 Elvis Manu (2019 Beijing Renhe)
 Richairo Zivkovic (2020 Guangzhou R&F, 2021 Changchun Yatai)
 Marko Vejinović (2021 Tianjin Jinmen Tiger)
 Deabeas Owusu-Sekyere (2022– Cangzhou Mighty Lions)

North Macedonia 
 Stojan Ignatov (2008 Beijing Guoan)
 Slavčo Georgievski (2008 Zhejiang Greentown)
 Vlatko Grozdanoski (2012 Liaoning Whowin)
 Veliče Šumulikoski (2012 Tianjin Teda)

Norway 
 Ole Selnæs (2019–2020 Shenzhen F.C., 2021 Hebei F.C.)
 Ola Kamara (2019 Shenzhen F.C.)
 Adama Diomande (2021 Cangzhou Mighty Lions)
 Fredrik Ulvestad (2021 Qingdao F.C.)

Poland 
 Marek Zając (2004–2008 Shenzhen Jianlibao)
 Bogdan Zając (2006–2007 Shenzhen Kingway)
 Emmanuel Olisadebe (2008–2010 Henan Construction)
 Krzysztof Mączyński (2014–2015 Guizhou Renhe)
 Mateusz Zachara (2015 Henan Jianye)
 Adrian Mierzejewski (2018 Changchun Yatai, 2019–2020 Chongqing Dangdai Lifan, 2020 Guangzhou R&F, 2021 Shanghai Shenhua, 2022– Henan Songshan Longmen)

Portugal 
 Joaquim Ferraz (2004 Qingdao Beilaite) 
 Hugo Carreira (2009 Qingdao Jonoon) 
 Manú (2012 Beijing Guoan)
 Ricardo Esteves (2012 Dalian Shide)
 Rúben Micael (2015–2016 Shijiazhuang Ever Bright)
 Ricardo Carvalho (2017 Shanghai SIPG)
 Ricardo Vaz Tê (2017–2018 Henan Jianye)
 José Fonte (2018 Dalian Yifang)
 Orlando Sá (2018 Henan Jianye)
 Dyego Sousa (2019 Shenzhen F.C.)
 Daniel Carriço (2020–2021 Wuhan Zall)
 João Silva (2021 Hebei F.C.)

Romania 
 Constantin Schumacher (2004 Chongqing Qiche)
 Viorel Domocoş (2004 Chongqing Qiche)
 Bogdan Mara (2004 Tianjin Teda)
 Ionel Gane (2004 Tianjin Teda)
 Dan Alexa (2004–2005 Beijing Guoan)
 Ionel Dănciulescu (2005 Shandong Luneng)
 Marian Aliuţă (2006 Changchun Yatai)
 Dumitru Mitu (2007 Qingdao Jonoon, 2008 Changchun Yatai)
 Ovidiu Burcă (2008 Beijing Guoan)
 Marius Radu (2008 Tianjin Teda)
 Alin Chiţa (2009 Tianjin Teda)
 Cristian Dănălache (2011–2013 Jiangsu Sainty)
 Marius Bilaşco (2011 Tianjin Teda)
 Lucian Goian (2012 Tianjin Teda)
 Marius Niculae (2013 Shandong Luneng)
 Cristian Tănase (2015 Tianjin Teda)
 Eric Bicfalvi (2015 Liaoning Whowin)
 Marius Constantin (2015 Jiangsu Guoxin Sainty)
 Nicolae Stanciu (2022– Wuhan Three Towns)

Scotland 
 Maurice Ross (2010 Beijing Guoan)
 Derek Riordan (2011 Shaanxi Chanba)

Serbia 
 Miodrag Pantelić (2004 Sichuan Guancheng, 2005–2006 Dalian Shide, 2007 Beijing Guoan) 
 Branko Jelić (2004–2005 Beijing Guoan, 2006–2007 Xiamen Lanshi)
 Vladimir Matijašević (2004 Shandong Luneng)
 Darko Anić (2004 Shandong Luneng)
 Branko Savić (2004 Liaoning Zhongyu)
 Branimir Petrović (2005 Shandong Luneng)
 Marko Zorić (2005–2006 Tianjin Teda, 2009 Shenzhen Ruby, 2010–2011 Tianjin Teda)
 Aleksandar Živković (2006–2009 Shandong Luneng, 2010 Shenzhen Ruby)
 Ivan Jovanović (2006 Shanghai Shenhua)
 Despot Visković (2006 Qingdao Jonoon)
 Saša Zimonjić (2006 Xiamen Lanshi)
 Pavle Delibašić (2006 Chongqing Lifan)
 Saša Zorić (2007 Changsha Ginde, 2007 Xiamen Lanshi)
 Nikola Malbaša (2007 Shandong Luneng)
 Branko Baković (2007 Shandong Luneng)
 Miodrag Anđelković (2007 Dalian Shide)
 Darko Drinić (2007 Dalian Shide)
 Vidak Bratić (2007 Tianjin Teda)
 Miljan Mrdaković (2008–2009 Shandong Luneng, 2012 Jiangsu Sainty)
 Dragan Stančić (2008, 2009 Qingdao Jonoon)
 Marko Sočanac (2008–2009 Qingdao Jonoon)
 Milan Nikolić (2008 Changsha Ginde)
 Dragan Vukmir (2008 Dalian Shide)
 Miloš Bajalica (2010 Henan Construction, 2010–2011 Shaanxi Chanba)
 Goran Gavrančić (2010 Henan Construction)
 Siniša Radanović (2010 Shandong Luneng)
 Borko Veselinović (2010 Dalian Shide)
 Ivan Vukomanović (2010 Qingdao Jonoon)
 Dušan Đokić (2010 Chongqing Lifan)
 Miloš Mihajlov (2010 Changchun Yatai)
 Radomir Koković (2011 Changchun Yatai)
 Vladimir Bogdanović (2011 Liaoning Whowin)
 Aleksandar Jevtić (2011–2013 Jiangsu Sainty, 2014 Liaoning Whowin)
 Andrija Kaluđerović (2012 Beijing Guoan)
 Marko Ljubinković (2012 Changchun Yatai)
 Miloš Trifunović (2012–2013 Liaoning Whowin)
 Novak Martinović (2013 Wuhan Zall)
 Miloš Stojanović (2013 Wuhan Zall)
 Miloš Bosančić (2015 Hangzhou Greentown)
 Nikola Petković (2016–2017 Yanbian Funde)
 Ognjen Ožegović (2016 Changchun Yatai)
 Nemanja Gudelj (2017 Tianjin Teda, 2018 Guangzhou Evergrande Taobao)
 Marko Perović (2018 Guangzhou R&F)
 Duško Tošić (2018–2020 Guangzhou R&F)
 Nemanja Pejčinović (2018 Changchun Yatai)
 Jagoš Vuković (2020–2021 Qingdao Huanghai)
 Stefan Mihajlović (2022– Cangzhou Mighty Lions)
 Rade Dugalić (2022– Meizhou Hakka)
 Aleksa Vukanović (2022– Meizhou Hakka)
 Nemanja Bosančić (2022– Dalian Pro)
 Aleksandar Andrejević (2023– Qingdao Hainiu)

Slovakia 
 Tomáš Medveď (2005 Shenyang Ginde)
 Tomáš Oravec (2011 Shaanxi Chanba)
 Marek Hamšík (2019–2020 Dalian Yifang)

Slovenia 
 Ermin Šiljak (2004 Dalian Shide)
 Blaž Puc (2006 Shenyang Ginde)
 Darko Kremenovič (2007 Henan Construction)
 Aleksander Rodić (2009 Shanghai Shenhua, 2010 Qingdao Jonoon)
 Tomislav Mišura (2010 Qingdao Jonoon)
 Janez Zavrl (2011 Shenzhen Ruby)
 Ermin Rakovič (2011 Shenzhen Ruby)
 Luka Žinko (2013–2014 Hangzhou Greentown)
 Miral Samardžić (2016 Henan Jianye)
 Denis Popović (2020–2021 Qingdao Huanghai)
 Robert Berić (2022– Tianjin Jinmen Tiger)

Spain 
 Nano (2012–2013 Guizhou Renhe)
 Rafa Jordà (2012–2013 Guizhou Renhe)
 Rubén Suárez (2012 Guizhou Renhe)
 Ibán Cuadrado (2013–2014 Shanghai East Asia)
 Miguel Alfonso Herrero (2015 Guangzhou R&F)
 Jonathan Soriano (2017–2018 Beijing Sinobo Guoan)
 Mario Suárez (2017–2018 Guizhou HFZC)
 Rubén Castro (2017 Guizhou HFZC)
 Jonathan Viera (2018–2019, 2020–2021 Beijing Sinobo Guoan)
 Juan Cala (2018 Henan Jianye)
 David Andújar (2022– Tianjin Jinmen Tiger)
 Tomás Pina (2022– Henan Songshan Longmen)
 Fran Mérida (2022– Tianjin Jinmen Tiger)

Sweden 
 Daniel Nannskog (2004 Sichuan Guancheng)
 Tobias Hysén (2014–2015 Shanghai SIPG)
 Niklas Backman (2014 Dalian Aerbin)
 Imad Khalili (2014 Shanghai SIPG)
 Magnus Eriksson (2015 Guizhou Renhe)
 Gustav Svensson (2016, 2021 Guangzhou City)
 Osman Sow (2016 Henan Jianye)
 Marcus Danielson (2020–2021 Dalian Pro)
 Sam Larsson (2020–2021 Dalian Pro)

Switzerland 
 Oumar Kondé (2009 Chengdu Blades)

Turkey 
 Ahmet Dursun (2004 Tianjin Teda)
 Ersan Gülüm (2016 Hebei China Fortune)
 Burak Yılmaz (2016–2017 Beijing Guoan)

Ukraine 
 Oleksandr Holovko (2004 Qingdao Beilaite) 
 Serhiy Konovalov (2004 Qingdao Beilaite) 
 Victor Brovchenko (2006–2007 Liaoning FC)

North & Central America, Caribbean – CONCACAF

Costa Rica 
 Erick Scott (2008 Shanghai Shenhua)
 Johnny Woodly Lambert (2009, 2010 Chongqing Lifan, 2010 Changchun Yatai)
 Rodolfo Rodríguez (2010 Tianjin Teda)
 Porfirio López Meza (2010 Dalian Shide)
 José Luis López (2010 Dalian Shide)
 Michael Barrantes (2015 Shanghai Shenxin)
 Felicio Brown Forbes (2022 Wuhan Yangtze River, 2023– Qingdao Hainiu)

Guadeloupe 
 Olivier Fauconnier (2007 Henan Construction)

Guatemala 
 Marvin Ávila (2009 Shaanxi Chanba)

Honduras 
 Saul Martínez (2004–2005, 2007 Shanghai Shenhua, 2006 Shanghai United)
 Luis Ramírez (2006 Shanghai Shenhua, 2008–2009 Guangzhou Pharmaceutical, 2010–2011 Hangzhou Greentown)
 Elvis Scott (2006–2008, 2009 Changchun Yatai, 2008 Beijing Guoan) 
 Samuel Caballero (2006–2010 Changchun Yatai) 
 Victor Mena (2006 Changchun Yatai) 
 Walter Martínez (2007–2008, 2010–2011 Beijing Guoan)
 Emil Martínez (2008 Shanghai Shenhua, 2009 Beijing Guoan, 2010 Hangzhou Greentown)
 Mitchel Brown (2008 Qingdao Jonoon)
 Jerry Palacios (2010 Hangzhou Greentown)
 Mauricio Sabillón (2010 Hangzhou Greentown)
 Julio César de León (2010–2011 Shandong Luneng)
 Randy Diamond (2011 Hangzhou Greentown)
 Rony Flores (2011 Shenzhen Ruby)
 Rubilio Castillo (2023– Nantong Zhiyun)

Jamaica 
 Demar Stewart (2008–2009 Chengdu Blades)
 Roen Nelson (2009 Chengdu Blades)
 Ryan Johnson (2014 Henan Jianye)

Martinique 
 Yoann Arquin (2021  Wuhan F.C.)

Trinidad and Tobago 
 Kevaughn Connell (2010 Nanchang Hengyuan)

United States 
 Lyle Martin (2010 Shaanxi Chanba)

Oceania – OFC

New Zealand 
 Chris Killen (2010–2011 Shenzhen Ruby)
 Ivan Vicelich (2010 Shenzhen Ruby)

South America – CONMEBOL

Argentina 
 José Luis Díaz (2004 Tianjin Teda)
 Javier Martin Musa (2006 Beijing Guoan)
 Roberto Demus (2006 Wuhan Optics Valley)
 Matías Marchesini (2008 Shanghai Shenhua)
 César La Paglia (2008 Wuhan Optics Valley)
 Hernán Barcos (2009 Shanghai Shenhua, 2009 Shenzhen Ruby, 2015 Tianjin Teda)
 Sebastián Setti (2010 Changchun Yatai)
 Matías Villavicencio (2010 Shanghai Shenhua)
 Luciano Olguín (2010–2011 Tianjin Teda)
 Luis Salmerón (2011 Shanghai Shenhua)
 Facundo Pérez Castro (2011 Shanghai Shenhua)
 Marcos Flores (2011–2012 Henan Construction)
 Darío Conca (2011–2013 Guangzhou Evergrande, 2015–2016 Shanghai SIPG)
 Gustavo Rodas (2012 Guizhou Renhe)
 Pablo Brandán (2012–2013 Liaoning Whowin)
 Leonardo Pisculichi (2012–2013 Shandong Luneng)
 Rolando Schiavi (2013 Shanghai Shenhua) 
 Patricio Toranzo (2013 Shanghai Shenhua)
 Pablo Nicolás Caballero (2013 Qingdao Jonoon)
 Walter Montillo (2014–2016 Shandong Luneng)
 Pablo Batalla (2014–2015 Beijing Guoan)
 Walter Iglesias (2014 Changchun Yatai)
 Lucas Viatri (2014 Shanghai Greenland)
 Esteban Solari (2014 Dalian Aerbin)
 Emanuel Gigliotti (2015–2016 Chongqing Lifan)
 Ezequiel Lavezzi (2016–2019 Hebei China Fortune)
 Carlos Tevez (2017 Shanghai Greenland Shenhua)
 Javier Mascherano (2018–2019 Hebei China Fortune)
 Augusto Fernández (2018–2019 Beijing Renhe)
 Nicolás Aguirre (2018 Chongqing Dangdai Lifan)
 Nicolás Gaitán (2018 Dalian Yifang)
 Matías Vargas (2022– Shanghai Port)
 Guido Carrillo (2022 Henan Songshan Longmen)

Bolivia 
 Milton Coimbra (2006 Beijing Guoan) 
 Ronald Rivero (2011 Shenzhen Ruby)
 Marcelo Moreno (2015–2016 Changchun Yatai)

Brazil 
 Adilson dos Santos (2004–2005 Dalian Shide)
 Zé Alcino (2004–2005 Inter Shanghai)
 Hugo Henrique (2004 Chongqing Qiche)
 Ozeias Fernando Graciano (2004 Shenzhen Jianlibao)
 Vicente de Paula Neto (2005, 2007 Wuhan Optics Valley, 2006 Xi'an Chanba, 2008–2009 Shaanxi Chanba, 2010 Shanghai Shenhua)
 Gílsinho (2005–2007 Wuhan Huanghelou, 2008 Henan Construction)
 Anderson Martins Pedro (2005 Wuhan Huanghelou)
 Rafael Pereira Pinto (2005 Wuhan Huanghelou)
 Aurélio (2006 Tianjin Teda)
 Tiago Honorio (2006 Shanghai United, 2007–2008 Beijing Guoan, 2010 Shenzhen Ruby)
 Aderaldo Ferreira André (2006 Shanghai United, 2007 Beijing Guoan, 2010 Shanghai Shenhua)
 Jonas Ciciliato Massaranduba (2006 Shanghai United)
 Renato Ribas (2006 Shanghai United)
 Rafael Jaques (2006 Wuhan Optics Valley)
 Carlos Eduardo (2006 Wuhan Optics Valley)
 José Ilson dos Santos (2006 Shenyang Ginde) 
 Alex Alves (2006 Shenyang Ginde) 
 Fabiano Cezar Viegas (2006 Qingdao Jonoon) 
 Alysson Marendaz Marins (2007 Beijing Guoan) 
 Taila de Souza Charles (2007 Tianjin Teda)
 Márcio Santos (2007 Tianjin Teda)
 Bruno Lança Andrade (2007 Wuhan Optics Valley)
 Roberto Aleixo (2007 Wuhan Optics Valley)
 Sandro Cardoso dos Santos (2007–2008, 2010 Changsha Ginde, 2009 Shandong Luneng)
 Argélico Fucks (2007 Zhejiang Greentown) 
 Eduardo Marques (2007 Zhejiang Greentown) 
 Wagner da Silva Santos (2007 Zhejiang Greentown) 
 Marcelo Rosa da Silva (2007 Zhejiang Greentown) 
 Alex Chandre de Oliveira (2007 Zhejiang Greentown) 
 Ronny Carlos da Silva (2007–2009 Shaanxi Chanba)
 Rafael Scheidt (2007–2008 Shaanxi Chanba)
 Sergio Júnior (2007 Shaanxi Chanba) 
 Milson Ferreira dos Santos (2007 Shenzhen Shangqingyin)
 Luciano Ratinho (2008 Shandong Luneng)
 Jonhes Elias Pinto Dos Santos (2008 Tianjin Teda)
 Éber Luís Cucchi (2008–2009 Tianjin Teda, 2010 Jiangsu Sainty, 2011 Qingdao Jonoon)
 Diego de Lima Barcelos (2008–2009 Guangzhou Pharmaceutical) 
 José Filho Duarte (2008 Guangzhou Pharmaceutical, 2009–2010 Chongqing Lifan) 
 Valdo (2008–2009 Zhejiang Greentown, 2010 Beijing Guoan, 2011 Liaoning Whowin)
 Douglas Roberto dos Santos (2008 Henan Construction)
 Tales Rejane Cabeceira (2008 Changsha Ginde) 
 Edson Ferreira da Silva (2008 Shenzhen Shangqingyin) 
 Felipe Arruda Menegon (2008 Shenzhen Shangqingyin) 
 Auricelio Neres Rodrigues (2008–2009 Chengdu Blades) 
 Denílson Souza (2008 Chengdu Blades) 
 Jefferson Feijão (2008 Liaoning Whowin, 2009 Changsha Ginde) 
 José Roberto Lucini (2008 Liaoning Whowin) 
 Danilo Moreira Serrano (2008 Wuhan Optics Valley)
 Gustavo Saibt Martins (2008 Wuhan Optics Valley)
 Emerson Roberto Conceicao Aleixo (2008 Wuhan Optics Valley)
 Netto (2009–2012 Henan Construction)
 Agnaldo Novaes dos Santos (2009 Chengdu Blades) 
 Diogo de Lima Barcelos (2009 Guangzhou Pharmaceutical) 
 Carlos Mario Ceballos Agualimpia (2009 Jiangsu Sainty) 
 Eleílson Farias de Moura (2009–2015 Jiangsu Sainty) 
 Geninho (2009–2010 Jiangsu Sainty) 
 Rodolfo Kumbrevicius Andorno de Oliveira (2009 Jiangsu Sainty) 
 Adonis Soares Pavani (2009 Shenzhen Ruby)
 Renan Augustinho Marques (2009 Shenzhen Ruby)
 Estevao Alvarenga Toniato (2009 Shaanxi Chanba)
 André Francisco Williams Rocha da Silva (2009 Hangzhou Greentown)
 Aílton Gonçalves da Silva (2009 Chongqing Lifan)
 Pedro Henrique Martins (2010 Jiangsu Sainty) 
 Célio Ferreira dos Santos (2010 Shaanxi Chanba)
 Andrezinho (2010 Liaoning Whowin)
 Felipe de Oliveira Conceição (2010 Liaoning Whowin)
 Beto (2010 Nanchang Bayi)
 Francisco Alex Moraes (2010 Nanchang Hengyuan)
 Johnny Osório (2010–2015 Shanghai Shenxin)
 Carlos Santos (2010 Shandong Luneng)
 Nei (2010–2011 Changchun Yatai)
 Márcio Senna (2010 Dalian Shide)
 Alexsandro da Silva (2010 Nanchang Hengyuan)
 Gilcimar (2010 Liaoning Whowin)
 Davi (2011 Beijing Guoan)
 Roberto Calmon Félix (2011 Beijing Guoan)
 Dori (2011 Changchun Yatai, 2014 Harbin Yiteng)
 Muriqui (2011–2014, 2017 Guangzhou Evergrande, 2020–2021 Shijiazhuang Ever Bright)
 Cléo (2011–2012 Guangzhou Evergrande, 2020 Qingdao Huanghai)
 Paulão (2011–2012 Guangzhou Evergrande)
 Renato Cajá (2011 Guangzhou Evergrande)
 Fabão (2011 Henan Construction)
 Thiago Potiguar (2011 Henan Construction)
 Rômulo (2011 Henan Construction)
 Léo San (2011–2012 Qingdao Jonoon)
 Wilson (2011 Shaanxi Chanba)
 Renato Silva (2011 Shandong Luneng)
 Obina (2011–2012 Shandong Luneng)
 Adriano (2011–2012 Dalian Shide)
 di Carmo (2011 Nanchang Hengyuan)
 Camilo (2011 Nanchang Hengyuan)
 Paulo Roberto (2011 Nanchang Hengyuan)
 Fabiano (2011–2012 Shandong Luneng)
 Reinaldo (2012 Beijing Guoan)
 Cássio (2012 Changchun Yatai)
 Weldon (2012 Changchun Yatai)
 Fábio Rochemback (2012–2013 Dalian Aerbin)
 Davi Rodrigues de Jesus (2012–2014 Guangzhou R&F, 2015 Shanghai SIPG)
 Jumar José da Costa Júnior (2012–2013 Guangzhou R&F)
 Leonardo Gonçalves Silva (2012 Guangzhou R&F)
 Rafael Coelho (2012–2013 Guangzhou R&F, 2014 Changchun Yatai)
 Fabrício (2012 Hangzhou Greentown)
 Renatinho (2012 Hangzhou Greentown)
 Mazola (2012–2013 Hangzhou Greentown)
 Gilberto Macena (2012–2013 Shandong Luneng, 2014 Hangzhou Greentown)
 Moisés (2012 Shanghai Shenhua)
 Anselmo (2012 Shanghai Shenxin)
 Antônio Flávio (2012–2013 Shanghai Shenxin)
 Jaílton Paraíba (2012–2014 Shanghai Shenxin)
 Adaílton (2012 Henan Construction)
 Bruno Meneghel (2012–2013 Qingdao Jonoon, 2014 Dalian Aerbin, 2016–2017 Changchun Yatai)
 André Lima (2013 Beijing Guoan)
 Éder Baiano (2013 Changchun Yatai)
 Zé Carlos (2013 Changchun Yatai)
 Isac (2013 Changchun Yatai)
 Elkeson (2013–2015, 2019–2021 Guangzhou Evergrande Taobao, 2016–2019 Shanghai SIPG)
 Edu (2013 Liaoning Whowin)
 Gustavo (2013 Qingdao Jonoon)
 Kieza (2013–2014 Shanghai Shenxin)
 Éder Lima (2013–2014 Tianjin Teda)
 Dinélson (2013 Tianjin Teda)
 Santos (2013 Wuhan Zall)
 Eninho (2013–2014 Changchun Yatai)
 Vágner Love (2013–2014 Shandong Luneng)
 Andrezinho (2013–2015 Tianjin Teda)
 Baré (2013–2014 Tianjin Teda)
 Renê Júnior (2014–2015 Guangzhou Evergrande)
 Hyuri (2014–2015 Guizhou Renhe, 2017 Chongqing Dangdai Lifan)
 Anselmo Ramon (2014–2016 Hangzhou Greentown)
 Rodrigo Paixão Mesquita (2014 Harbin Yiteng)
 Aloísio (2014–2016 Shandong Luneng, 2016–2017 Hebei China Fortune, 2020–2021 Guangzhou Evergrande Taobao)
 Rafael Marques Mariano (2014 Henan Jianye)
 Paulo André (2014 Shanghai Greenland)
 Junior Urso (2014–2015 Shandong Luneng, 2017–2018 Guangzhou R&F)
 Elias (2014 Jiangsu Sainty)
 Paulo Henrique (2014–2015 Shanghai Greenland, 2015 Liaoning Whowin)
 Everton (2014–2015 Shanghai Shenxin)
 Guto (2015 Chongqing Lifan)
 Ricardo Santos (2015 Guizhou Renhe)
 Ricardo Goulart (2015–2018, 2021 Guangzhou F.C., 2020 Hebei China Fortune)
 Alan Carvalho (2015–2018, 2021 Guangzhou F.C., 2019 Tianjin Tianhai, 2020 Beijing Sinobo Guoan)
 Diego Tardelli (2015–2018 Shandong Luneng)
 Lucas Fonseca (2015 Tianjin Teda)
 Jajá (2015 Chongqing Lifan)
 Rodrigo Defendi (2015 Shijiazhuang Ever Bright)
 Zé Eduardo (2015 Shanghai Shenxin)
 Ivo (2015–2016, 2018–2021 Henan Jianye, 2018 Beijing Renhe)
 Jael Ferreira (2015–2016 Chongqing Lifan)
 Jucilei (2015–2016 Shandong Luneng)
 Paulinho (2015–2017, 2018–2020 Guangzhou Evergrande Taobao)
 Fernandinho Henrique (2015–2019 Chongqing Lifan, 2019 Hebei China Fortune, 2020–2021 Guangzhou Evergrande Taobao)
 Wágner (2015–2016 Tianjin TEDA)
 Renatinho (2015–2018, 2020 Guangzhou R&F, 2019 Tianjin Tianhai)
 Kléber (2015–2016 Beijing Guoan)
 Robinho (2015 Guangzhou Evergrande Taobao)
 Bruninho (2016 Guangzhou R&F)
 Ralf (2016–2017 Beijing Guoan)
 Renato Augusto (2016–2021 Beijing Guoan)
 Gil (2016–2019 Shandong Luneng)
 Ramires (2016–2019 Jiangsu Suning)
 Alex Teixeira (2016–2020 Jiangsu Suning)
 Jô (2016 Jiangsu Suning)
 Diego Maurício (2016 Shijiazhuang Ever Bright)
 Denílson Gabionetta (2016 Hangzhou Greentown)
 Matheus (2016, 2020 Shijiazhuang Ever Bright, 2022 Zhejiang)
 Hulk (2016–2020 Shanghai SIPG)
 Alan Kardec (2016–2020 Chongqing Lifan, 2021 Shenzhen F.C.)
 Geuvânio (2017 Tianjin Quanjian)
 Oscar (2017– Shanghai SIPG)
 Marinho (2017–2018 Changchun Yatai)
 Alexandre Pato (2017–2018 Tianjin Quanjian)
 Hernanes (2017, 2018 Hebei China Fortune)
 Júnior Moraes (2017 Tianjin Quanjian)
 Luiz Fernandinho (2018–2021 Chongqing Dangdai Lifan)
 Johnathan (2018–2020 Tianjin Teda,2022 Chengdu Rongcheng)
 Talisca (2018–2020 Guangzhou Evergrande Taobao)
 Sebá (2018 Chongqing Dangdai Lifan)
 Fernando Karanga (2018,2019– Henan Jianye)
 Róger Guedes (2018–2019, 2020 Shandong Luneng)
 Rafael Silva (2019–2020, 2021 Wuhan Zall)
 Léo Baptistão (2019–2021 Wuhan Zall)
 Marcão (2019–2021 Hebei China Fortune, 2022 Wuhan Three Towns)
 Henrique Dourado (2019, 2020–2022 Henan Jianye)
 Leonardo (2019 Tianjin Tianhai, 2020 Shandong Luneng)
 Moisés (2019– Shandong Luneng)
 Marcinho (2019–2020 Chongqing Dangdai Lifan)
 Miranda (2019–2020 Jiangsu Suning)
 Fernando (2019–2020 Beijing Sinobo Guoan)
 Paulinho (2020–2021 Hebei China Fortune, 2021– Shanghai Port)
 Rômulo (2020 Shijiazhuang Ever Bright)
 Marcelo Cirino (2020 Chongqing Dangdai Lifan)
 Ricardo Lopes (2020–2021 Shanghai SIPG)
 Sandro Lima (2020 Tianjin Teda)
 Francisco Soares (2020 Tianjin Teda)
 Jailson Siqueira (2020–2021 Dalian Pro)
 Lucas Souza (2021 Beijing Guoan, 2021 Changchun Yatai)
 Erik Lima (2021–2022 Changchun Yatai)
 Júnior Negrão (2021–2022 Changchun Yatai)
 Serginho (2021– Changchun Yatai)
 Tiago Leonço (2021 Guangzhou City)
 Guilherme (2021– Guangzhou City)
 Leonardo (2021 Shandong Taishan, 2021 Hebei F.C.)
 Magno Cruz (2021 Tianjin Jinmen Tiger)
 Anderson Lopes (2021 Wuhan F.C.)
 Jadson (2021– Shandong Taishan)
 Anderson Silva (2021 Beijing Guoan)
 Felipe (2022– Chengdu Rongcheng)
 Rômulo (2022– Chengdu Rongcheng)
 Rodrigo Henrique (2022– Meizhou Hakka)
 Crysan (2022– Shandong Taishan)
 Farley Rosa (2022– Tianjin Jinmen Tiger)
 Éder Lima (2022 Tianjin Jinmen Tiger)
 Ademilson (2022– Wuhan Three Towns)
 Davidson (2022– Wuhan Three Towns)
 Wallace (2022– Wuhan Three Towns)
 Bruno Viana (2022 Wuhan Yangtze River)
 Lucas Possignolo (2022– Zhejiang)
 Saldanha (2022 Chengdu Rongcheng)
 Bressan (2023– Nantong Zhiyun)
 Lucas Morelatto (2023– Nantong Zhiyun)

Chile 
 Adán Vergara (2009 Dalian Shide)
 José Luis Villanueva (2010 Tianjin Teda)
 Gustavo Canales (2012 Dalian Aerbin)

Colombia 
 Hamilton Ricard (2007–2008 Shanghai Shenhua)
 Ricardo Steer (2009–2010 Changchun Yatai, 2014 Harbin Yiteng)
 Carlos Ceballos (2009 Jiangsu Sainty) 
 Leiner Gomez Viafara (2009 Jiangsu Sainty) 
 Duvier Riascos (2010–2011 Shanghai Shenhua, 2018 Dalian Yifang)
 Juan Camilo Angulo (2011 Shanghai Shenhua)
 Yovanny Arrechea (2011 Changchun Yatai)
 Javier Andres Estupinan Romero (2011 Chengdu Blades)
 Eisner Iván Loboa (2011 Shanghai Shenhua)
 John Mosquera (2012 Changchun Yatai)
 Edixon Perea (2012 Changchun Yatai)
 Giovanni Moreno (2012–2021 Shanghai Shenhua)
 Luis Carlos Cabezas (2013 Shanghai East Asia)
 Carmelo Valencia (2013–2014 Tianjin Teda)
 Luis Carlos Ruiz (2014 Shanghai Shenhua)
 Edison Toloza (2014 Jiangsu Sainty)
 Wilmar Jordán (2015 Tianjin Teda)
 Fredy Guarín (2016–2019 Shanghai Greenland Shenhua)
 Jackson Martínez (2016 Guangzhou Evergrande Taobao)
 Fredy Montero (2016 Tianjin Teda)
 Roger Martínez (2016–2017 Jiangsu Suning)
 Harold Preciado (2019–2020 Shenzhen F.C.)
 Jown Cardona (2021– Guangzhou City)
 Juan Fernando Quintero (2021 Shenzhen F.C.)

Ecuador 
 Joffre Guerrón (2012–2014 Beijing Guoan)
 Jaime Ayoví (2018 Beijing Renhe)
 Fidel Martínez (2020 Shanghai Shenhua)
 Miller Bolaños (2020,2022 Shanghai Shenhua, 2021 Chongqing Liangjiang Athletic)

Paraguay 
 Justo Rolando Meza (2008 Shanghai Shenhua)
 Michel Marcio Valenzuela (2008 Shenzhen Shangqingyin)
 Lucas Barrios (2012–2013 Guangzhou Evergrande)
 José Ortigoza (2012 Shandong Luneng)
 Óscar Romero (2018–2019 Shanghai Greenland Shenhua)

Peru 
 Aldo Olcese (2005 Shenyang Ginde)
 Ismael Enrique Alvarado (2008–2009 Guangzhou Pharmaceutical)
 Paolo de la Haza (2011 Jiangsu Sainty)

Uruguay 
 Peter Vera (2004 Shanghai Shenhua)
 Fernando Correa (2007 Shanghai Shenhua)
 Diego Alonso (2007 Shanghai Shenhua)
 Sergio Blanco (2007 Shanghai Shenhua)
 Juan Manuel Olivera (2007 Shaanxi Chanba)
 Pablo Munhoz (2008 Wuhan Optics Valley)
 Edgar Martínez (2009 Chongqing Lifan)
 Matías Masiero (2011 Hangzhou Greentown)
 Paulo Pezzolano (2011 Hangzhou Greentown)
 Sebastián Vázquez (2011 Hangzhou Greentown)
 Jonathan Ramis (2011 Nanchang Hengyuan)
 Diego Vera (2011 Nanchang Hengyuan)

Venezuela 
 Alejandro Cichero (2008–2009 Shandong Luneng)
 Mario Rondón (2015–2016 Shijiazhuang Ever Bright)
 Salomón Rondón (2019–2020, 2021 Dalian Pro)

See also
 Chinese Super League

Notes

References
 CSL players 

Chinese Super League

 
Association football player non-biographical articles